Area codes 217 and 447 are telephone area codes in the North American Numbering Plan (NANP) for much of the central part of the U.S. state of Illinois. The numbering plan area (NPA) includes the state capital, Springfield, and Champaign, Urbana, Decatur, Taylorville, Danville,  Effingham, Quincy, Rantoul, and Jacksonville. 217 was one of the original North American area codes created in 1947 and 447 was added to the same area in 2021 to form an all-services overlay.

History
In the original configuration of the first nationwide telephone numbering plan, the numbering plan area 217 included most of Metro East, the Illinois side of the St. Louis metropolitan area.  In 1951, a slight boundary shift reassigned most of the southern portion of Metro East to area code 618, leaving the northern portion in 217. The only other significant change in boundaries was in 1957, when its northern portion (Peoria, Bloomington-Normal) was combined with part of the region of area code 815 to form a new numbering plan area with area code 309.

In 2006, the Illinois Commerce Commission approved an all-services overlay for the numbering plan area, adding new area code 447 in 2021. As of March 27, 2021, new central office codes are available for activation by service providers.  A permissive dialing period was in effect from August 29, 2020, to February 27, 2021, when ten-digit dialing for local calls became mandatory.

Service area
Smaller municipalities in the numbering plan area are:

 Arcola
 Arthur
 Assumption
 Athens
 Auburn
 Augusta
 Beardstown
 Benld
 Casey
 Carlinville
 Carthage
 Chandlerville
 Charleston
 Chatham
 Clinton
 Danville
 Decatur
 Effingham
 Forsyth
 Georgetown
 Gibson City
 Gillespie
 Girard
 Greenup
 Greenville
 Hamilton
 Harvel
 Hillsboro
 Hoopeston
 Illiopolis
 Indianola
 Jacksonville
 Jerome
 Leland Grove
 Lincoln
 Litchfield
 Macon
 Mahomet
 Maroa
 Marshall
 Mattoon
 Meredosia
 Monticello
 Morrisonville
 Mount Auburn
 Mount Zion
 Moweaqua
 Nauvoo
 New Berlin
 Nokomis
 Oconee
 Ogden
 Palmer
 Pana
 Paris
 Paxton
 Petersburg
 Pittsfield
 Quincy
 Rantoul
 Raymond
 Riverton
 Rochester
 Rushville
 Shelbyville
 Southern View
 St. Joseph
 Strasburg
 Sullivan
 Thawville
 Taylorville
 Teutopolis
 Toledo
 Tolono
 Tower Hill
 Tuscola
 Urbana
 Virden
 Westville
 Waggoner
 Warrensburg

See also
 List of North American Numbering Plan area codes
 List of Illinois area codes

References

External links

 List of exchanges from AreaCodeDownload.com, 217 Area Code

Telecommunications-related introductions in 1947
217
217
1947 establishments in Illinois